The 2007 Torneo Godó was a men's professional tennis tournament that was part of the International Series Gold of the 2007 ATP Tour. It was the 55th edition of the Torneo Godó and took place from 23 April until 29 April 2007 in Barcelona, Catalonia, Spain. Rafael Nadal won the singles title.

Finals

Singles

 Rafael Nadal defeated  Guillermo Cañas 6–3, 6–4

Doubles

 Andrei Pavel /  Alexander Waske defeated  Rafael Nadal /  Tomeu Salvà 6–3, 7–6(7–1)

External links
ITF tournament details

 
2007
Tennis Godo
Godo